Sebastian Idoff (born December 2, 1990) is a Swedish professional ice hockey goaltender, currently playing for Lørenskog of the Norwegian GET-ligaen.

Career statistics

Regular season and playoffs

External links

1990 births
Living people
Asplöven HC players
Borås HC players
Diables Rouges de Briançon players
Frölunda HC players
Lørenskog IK players
Manglerud Star Ishockey players
Örebro HK players
Södertälje SK players
Swedish ice hockey goaltenders
IF Troja/Ljungby players
Swedish expatriate ice hockey players in Norway
Swedish expatriate sportspeople in France
Sportspeople from Malmö